There are a number of listed buildings in Nottinghamshire. The term "listed building", in the United Kingdom, refers to a building or structure designated as being of special architectural, historical, or cultural significance. Details of all the listed buildings are contained in the National Heritage List for England. They are categorised in three grades: Grade I consists of buildings of outstanding architectural or historical interest, Grade II* includes significant buildings of more than local interest and Grade II consists of buildings of special architectural or historical interest. Buildings in England are listed by the Secretary of State for Culture, Media and Sport on recommendations provided by English Heritage, which also determines the grading.

Some listed buildings are looked after by the National Trust or English Heritage while others are in private ownership or administered by trusts.

Listed buildings by grade
 Grade I listed buildings in Nottinghamshire
 Grade II* listed buildings in Nottinghamshire

Listed buildings by civil parish or unparished area

Ashfield 

 Listed buildings in Annesley
 Listed buildings in Hucknall
 Listed buildings in Kirkby-in-Ashfield
 Listed buildings in Skegby
 Listed buildings in Sutton-in-Ashfield
 Listed buildings in Teversal

Bassetlaw 

 Listed buildings in Askham, Nottinghamshire
 Listed buildings in Babworth
 Listed buildings in Barnby Moor
 Listed buildings in Beckingham, Nottinghamshire
 Listed buildings in Blyth, Nottinghamshire
 Listed buildings in Bole, Nottinghamshire
 Listed buildings in Bothamsall
 Listed buildings in Hodsock
 Listed buildings in Ordsall, Nottinghamshire
 Listed buildings in Retford
 Listed buildings in Worksop

Broxtowe 

 Listed buildings in Attenborough and Chilwell
 Listed buildings in Awsworth
 Listed buildings in Beeston, Nottinghamshire
 Listed buildings in Bramcote
 Listed buildings in Brinsley

City of Nottingham

Gedling

Mansfield

Newark and Sherwood 

 Listed buildings in Averham
 Listed buildings in Balderton
 Listed buildings in Barnby in the Willows
 Listed buildings in Bathley
 Listed buildings in Besthorpe, Nottinghamshire
 Listed buildings in Bestwood St. Albans
 Listed buildings in Bilsthorpe
 Listed buildings in Bleasby, Nottinghamshire
 Listed buildings in Blidworth
 Listed buildings in Bulcote

Rushcliffe 

 Listed buildings in Aslockton
 Listed buildings in Barton in Fabis
 Listed buildings in Bingham, Nottinghamshire
 Listed buildings in Bradmore, Nottinghamshire

References

Listed buildings in Nottinghamshire